Paul Ehrenfest (18 January 1880 – 25 September 1933) was an Austrian theoretical physicist, who made major contributions to the field of statistical mechanics and its relations with quantum mechanics, including the theory of phase transition and the Ehrenfest theorem. He bonded with Albert Einstein on a visit to Prague in 1912 and became a professor in Leiden, where he frequently hosted Einstein.

Biography 
Paul Ehrenfest was born and grew up in Vienna to Jewish parents from Loštice in Moravia (now part of the Czech Republic). His parents, Sigmund Ehrenfest and Johanna Jellinek, ran a grocery store. Although the family was not overly religious, Paul studied Hebrew and the history of the Jewish people. Later, he always emphasized his Jewish roots. Ehrenfest excelled in grade school but did not do well at the Akademisches Gymnasium, his best subject being mathematics. After transferring to the Franz Josef Gymnasium, his marks improved. In 1899, he passed the final exams.

He majored in chemistry at the Vienna Institute of Technology, but took courses at the University of Vienna, in particular from Ludwig Boltzmann on his kinetic theory of thermodynamics. These lectures had a profound influence: they were instrumental in developing Ehrenfest's interest in theoretical physics, defined his main area of research for years to come, and provided an example of inspired teaching. At the time, it was customary in the German-speaking world to study at more than one university, and in 1901, Ehrenfest transferred to University of Göttingen, which until 1933 was an important centre for mathematics and theoretical physics. There he met his future wife, Tatyana Afanasyeva, a young mathematician born in Kyiv (then-capital of the Kiev Governorate, Russian Empire) and educated in St Petersburg. In the spring of 1903, he met Dutch physicist H.A. Lorentz during a short trip to Leiden, Netherlands. In the meantime, he prepared a dissertation on Die Bewegung starrer Körper in Flüssigkeiten und die Mechanik von Hertz (The Motion of Rigid Bodies in Fluids and the Mechanics of Hertz). He obtained his Ph.D. degree on 23 June 1904 in Vienna, where he stayed from 1904 to 1905.

On 21 December 1904, he married Afanasyeva, who collaborated with him in his work. They had two daughters and two sons: Tatyana ('Tanja') (1905–1984), also became a mathematician; Galinka ('Galja') (1910–1979), became an author and illustrator of children's books; Paul, Jr. ('Pavlik') (1915–1939), who also became a physicist; and Vassily ('Wassik') (1918–1933).

The Ehrenfests returned to Göttingen in September 1906. They would not see Boltzmann again: on 5 September Boltzmann took his own life in Duino near Trieste. Ehrenfest published an extensive obituary in which Boltzmann's accomplishments are described. Felix Klein, dean of the Göttinger mathematicians and chief editor of the Enzyklopädie der mathematischen Wissenschaften ("Encyclopedia of Mathematical Sciences"), had counted on Boltzmann for a review about statistical mechanics. Now he asked Ehrenfest to take on this task. Together with his wife, Ehrenfest worked on it for several years; the article was not published until 1911. It is a review of the work of Boltzmann and his school, and shows a style all of its own: a sharp logical analysis of the fundamental hypotheses, clear delineation of unsolved questions, and an explanation of general principles by cleverly chosen transparent examples.

In 1907, the couple moved to St. Petersburg. Ehrenfest found good friends there, in particular Soviet physicist A.F. Joffe, but felt scientifically isolated. Moreover, because he was unwilling to declare belief in any religious denomination, he could not apply for a professorship, and therefore had no prospect of securing a permanent position. Early in 1912, Ehrenfest set out on a tour of German-speaking universities in the hope of a position. He visited Berlin where he saw Max Planck, Leipzig where he saw his old friend German mathematician Gustav Herglotz, Munich where he met German theoretical physicist Arnold Sommerfeld, then Zürich and Vienna. While in Prague he met Albert Einstein for the first time, and they remained close friends thereafter. Einstein recommended Ehrenfest to succeed him in his position in Prague, but that did not work out. This was due to the fact that Ehrenfest had declared himself to be an atheist. Sommerfeld offered him a position in Munich, but Ehrenfest received a better offer; at the same time there was an unexpected turn of events. H. A. Lorentz resigned his position as professor at the University of Leiden, and on his advice, Ehrenfest was appointed as his successor.

Academic career 
In October 1912, Ehrenfest arrived in Leiden, and on 4 December, he gave his inaugural lecture, Zur Krise der Lichtaether-Hypothese (About the crisis of the light-ether hypothesis). He remained in Leiden for the rest of his career. In order to stimulate interaction and exchange among physics students, he organized a discussion group and a study association called De Leidsche Flesch ("The Leiden Bottle"). He maintained close contact with prominent physicists within the country and abroad, and invited them to visit Leiden University and give a presentation in his lecture series. Ehrenfest was an outstanding debater, quick to point out weaknesses and summarize the essentials. 
 
 
In his lectures, he would focus on simple models and examples to illustrate and clarify the underlying assumptions. His classes were small, and he made an effort to get to know students who made use of the reading room. Though few of them were accepted as majors in theoretical physics, he had long discussions with them almost daily. According to Einstein:

He was not merely the best teacher in our profession whom I have ever known; he was also passionately preoccupied with the development and destiny of men, especially his students. To understand others, to gain their friendship and trust, to aid anyone embroiled in outer or inner struggles, to encourage youthful talent—all this was his real element, almost more than his immersion in scientific problems.

If Ehrenfest felt that there was little more he could teach a student, he would send the student to other centers in Europe for more training. He would also encourage students to accept positions abroad.

Among his students were Johannes Burgers, Hendrik Kramers, Dirk Coster, George Uhlenbeck and Samuel Goudsmit, who became famous for jointly proposing the concept of electron spin, Jan Tinbergen, Arend Rutgers, Hendrik Casimir, Gerhard Dieke, Dirk Struik, and Gerard Kuiper. His assistants included Yuri Krutkov, Viktor Trkal, Adriaan Fokker, Paul Epstein, and Gregory Breit. Other young foreign scientists who spent an extended period in his laboratory included Gunnar Nordström, Enrico Fermi, Igor Tamm, Oskar Klein, J. Robert Oppenheimer, Walter Elsasser, Ralph Kronig, Werner Heisenberg, Paul Dirac, and David Dennison.

Ehrenfest held ambivalent views on science, technological progress, and cultural and social issues.

In 1919, he became a member of the Royal Netherlands Academy of Arts and Sciences.

Final years
From the correspondence with his close friends, from May 1931, it appears that Ehrenfest suffered from severe depression. By August 1932, Einstein was so worried that he wrote to the Board of the University of Leiden, expressing deep concern and suggesting ways in which Ehrenfest's workload could be reduced.

Having made arrangements for the care of his other children, on 25 September 1933, in Amsterdam, Ehrenfest fatally shot his younger son Wassik, who had Down syndrome, then killed himself.

Research 
Most of Ehrenfest's scientific papers deal with fundamentals, and seek to clarify single points. His publications are renowned for clarity, by solving paradoxes or by providing clearer descriptions, or are inspiring by posing melliferous questions. His approach to science is best illustrated by what he wrote to Robert Oppenheimer in the summer of 1928, after Oppenheimer invited himself for an extended stay in Leiden:

If you intend to mount heavy mathematical artillery again during your coming year in Europe, I would ask you not only not to come to Leiden, but if possible not even to Holland, and just because I am really so fond of you and want to keep it that way. But if, on the contrary, you want to spend at least your first few months patiently, comfortably, and joyfully in discussions that keep coming back to the same few points, chatting about a few basic questions with me and our young people—and without thinking much about publishing (!!!)—why then I welcome you with open arms!! Characteristically, he did not like the abstraction of the new quantum theory of Heisenberg and Dirac.

Ehrenfest's most important contribution from 1912 to 1933 is the theory of adiabatic invariants. It is a concept derived from classical mechanics that, on the one hand, can serve to refine certain methods of Niels Bohr's model of the atom (although initially Ehrenfest did not accept Bohr's ideas), and on the other hand, makes a link between atomic mechanics and statistical mechanics. He made major contributions to quantum physics, including the theory of phase transitions and the Ehrenfest theorem, which states that expectation values of a quantum system follow classical mechanics. His name is also given to the Ehrenfest paradox, an apparent paradox in relativity still discussed today, to the Ehrenfest model, and to Ehrenfest time, the time characterizing the departure of quantum dynamics for observables from classical dynamics.

Ehrenfest was also interested in developing mathematical theories in economics. This interest was stimulated by his notion that there should be an analogy between thermodynamics and economic processes. While this did not result in publications, he did encourage his graduate student Jan Tinbergen to follow up on this. Tinbergen's thesis was devoted to problems both from physics and economics, and he went on to become an economist and was awarded the first Nobel Memorial Prize in Economic Sciences in 1969.

Einstein and Bohr in Leiden 

Ehrenfest was particularly close to both Einstein and Bohr. After Niels Bohr's first visit to Leiden in 1919, for Kramers' thesis defense, he wrote to Ehrenfest:

I am sitting and thinking of all what you have told me about so very many different things, and whatever I think of I feel that I have learned so much from you which will be of great importance for me; but, at the same time, I wish so much to express my feeling of happiness over your friendship and of thankfulness for the confidence and sympathy you have shown me, I find myself so utterly incapable of finding words for it.

On his invitation Einstein accepted in 1920 an appointment as extraordinary professor at the University of Leiden. This arrangement allowed Einstein to visit Leiden for a few weeks every year. At these occasions Einstein would stay at Ehrenfest's home. In 1923 Einstein stayed there for six weeks, after German ultra-nationalists in Berlin had made threats against his life.
On the occasion of the 50th anniversary of Lorentz' doctorate (December 1925) Ehrenfest invited both Bohr and Einstein over to Leiden, in an attempt to reconcile their scientific differences about the emerging quantum theory. These discussions were continued at the 1927 Solvay Conference, where Ehrenfest much to his dismay had to side with Bohr's position in this great debate.

Quotes
Ehrenfest used colourful German language in his physics lectures:
Das ist der springende Punkt (translation: That is the crucial point)
Das ist wo der Frosch ins Wasser springt (That is where the frog jumps into the water)
Das ist der Patentanspruch (That is the patent claim, the essence)
Da hat Herr ... schlieslich der Ratte aus der Suppe gezogen (There Mr. ..finally pulled the rat out of the soup - when a scientist had solved a messy problem)
Je besser man's versteht um so besser steht es dort (The better one understands, the better it is written there, Ehrenfest's comment when Dirac was asked in writing for an explanation of his work, and Dirac characteristically simply reproduced exactly his previous explanation.)

Legacy
The monthly evening colloquium in physics at Leiden University, initiated by Paul Ehrenfest in 1912 at his house, still continues under the name Colloquium Ehrenfestii.

The Austrian Institute for Quantum Optics and Quantum Information sponsors the annual Paul Ehrenfest Best Paper Award for Quantum Foundations.

The Dutch Physics Council sponsors the annual Ehrenfest-Afanassjewa thesis award.

Bibliography
 H.B.G. Casimir: Haphazard Reality - Half a Century of Science. New York, Harper & Row, 1983.
 Martin J. Klein: Paul Ehrenfest: The Making of a Theoretical Physicist.  Biography of Paul Ehrenfest. Amsterdam: Elsevier.  . 1985 edition:

References

External links 
 The Tragic Fate of Physicist Paul Ehrenfest

1880 births
1933 suicides
Austrian atheists
Austrian Jews
20th-century Austrian physicists
Dutch Jews
Dutch people of Austrian descent
20th-century Dutch physicists
Jewish atheists
Jewish scientists
Academic staff of Leiden University
Members of the Royal Netherlands Academy of Arts and Sciences
Scientists from Vienna
Science teachers
Murder–suicides in Europe
1933 deaths
Dutch murderers
Austrian murderers
Suicides by firearm in the Netherlands
Emigrants from the Austro-Hungarian Empire to the Netherlands